The Fordington Twins is a 1920 British silent drama film directed by W. P. Kellino and starring Dallas Anderson, Mary Brough and Nita Russell. It is based on a novel by Edgar Newton Bungay. Two young brothers who live over a fishmongers in Bethnal Green inherit a large sum of money and a country estate, but are almost cheated out of it by a swindler.

Cast
 Dallas Anderson as Basil Markham 
 Mary Brough as Mrs. Margaretson 
 Nita Russell as Pat Wentworth 
 Cyril Smith as Cyril Raleigh 
 Whimsical Walker as Snagsby 
 Cecil del Gue as Mr. Wentworth

Bibliography
 Bamford, Kenton. Distorted Images: British National Identity and Film in the 1920s. I.B. Tauris, 1999.
 Low, Rachael. History of the British Film, 1918–1929. George Allen & Unwin, 1971.

References

External links
 

1920 films
British drama films
British silent feature films
Films directed by W. P. Kellino
1920 drama films
Films based on British novels
Films set in London
British black-and-white films
1920s English-language films
1920s British films
Silent drama films